Michael ("Mike") Munday (born October 14, 1980, in Winnipeg, Manitoba) is a male volleyball player from Canada, who competed for the Men's National Team as a setter. He was a member of the national squad who ended up in seventh place at the 2007 Pan American Games in Rio de Janeiro, Brazil. He is also a member of the 2019 MDU C Grade cricket Premiership team as a batsman

References
Canada Olympic Committee

1980 births
Living people
Canadian men's volleyball players
Pan American Games competitors for Canada
University of Manitoba alumni
Volleyball players at the 2007 Pan American Games
Volleyball players from Winnipeg